Roberto Miguel Lifschitz (13 September 1955 – 9 May 2021) was an Argentine politician and civil engineer of the Socialist Party who was Governor of Santa Fe Province from 2015 to 2019. Prior to that, he was intendente (mayor) of Rosario, the largest city in the province and the third largest in Argentina.

Career
Lifschitz earned his degree at the Engineering Faculty of the National University of Rosario in 1979, and worked in the private sector until 1989, when he became Director-General of the Public Housing Service (Director General del Servicio Público de la Vivienda) of the city of Rosario, under the socialist administration of Héctor Cavallero.

He continued working in various public offices, as Municipal Secretary-General (Secretario General de la Municipalidad), Public Services' Secretary (Secretario de Servicios Públicos) and General Cabinet Coordinator for the Municipality of Rosario (Coordinador General de Gabinete de la Municipalidad de Rosario), between June and December 2003, under the administration of Hermes Binner.

Lifschitz ran for Mayor of Rosario and was elected in the provincial elections of 7 September 2003 for the period 2003–2007. In 2006 he began acknowledging he could run for re-election. In March 2007, a survey showed that Lifschitz would win by a wide margin over any of the other major prospective candidates (52.9% of the total votes).

Lifschitz competed in the primaries of the Progressive, Civic and Social Front, on 1 July 2007, against Carlos Comi (of ARI); he obtained around 90% of the vote. In the main election of 2 September 2007, he won his re-election for the period 2007–2011 by a landslide (57–31%) over his closest competitor, former Socialist mayor Héctor Cavallero (who ran for the Peronist-led Front for Victory).

In the elections of 14 June 2015, he was elected as the new governor of the Province of Santa Fe, a position he assumed on 10 December.

Death 
In late April 2021, Lifschitz was admitted to hospital after testing positive for COVID-19. His condition worsened by 25 April and he was transferred to intensive care unit and placed on a respirator and was in a coma. He died on 9 May.

References

External links

1955 births
2021 deaths
Argentine civil engineers
Argentine Jews
Argentine people of German-Jewish descent
Deaths from the COVID-19 pandemic in Argentina
Governors of Santa Fe Province
Jewish Argentine politicians
Jewish mayors
Mayors of Rosario, Santa Fe
National University of Rosario alumni
People from Rosario, Santa Fe
Socialist Party (Argentina) politicians